Joseph T. "Joe" Hallinan is an American journalist and author. He has written on the criminal justice system in the United States.

While a journalist with the Indianapolis Star he and Susan M. Headden shared the 1991 Pulitzer Prize for Investigative Reporting "for their shocking series on medical malpractice in the state." Hallinan was named a Nieman Fellow at Harvard. He has written Going Up the River: Travels in a Prison Nation (2001).

Hallinan has taught at a number of American colleges and universities, and was most recently a visiting professor at Vanderbilt University. He has appeared on a variety of radio and television programs in the U.S. and abroad, including NPR's Fresh Air with Teri Gross and The O'Reilly Factor on Fox News.

Hallinan is a 1984 magna cum laude graduate of Boston University. He lives in Chicago with his wife, Pamela Taylor, and their three children.

Books
 Errornomics
 Why We Make Mistakes: How We Look Without Seeing, Forget Things in Seconds, And Are All Pretty Sure We Are Way Above Average
 Going Up The River: Travels in a Prison Nation
 Kidding Ourselves

References

Non-fiction crime writers
Pulitzer Prize for Investigative Reporting winners
American legal writers
Living people
Year of birth missing (living people)
Nieman Fellows
The Indianapolis Star people
Boston University alumni